Martial arts films are a subgenre of action films that feature numerous martial arts combat between characters. These combats are usually the films' primary appeal and entertainment value, and often are a method of storytelling and character expression and development. Martial arts are frequently featured in training scenes and other sequences in addition to fights. Martial arts films commonly include hand-to-hand combat along with other types of action, such as stuntwork, chases, and gunfights. Sub-genres of martial arts films include kung fu films, wuxia, karate films, and martial arts action comedy films, while related genres include gun fu, jidaigeki and samurai films.

History

The first ever martial arts film was a Chinese film released in 1928, The Burning of the Red Lotus Temple (also translated as "The Burning of the Red Lotus Monastery"), a silent film directed by Chinese film director Ying Yunwei and produced by the Mingxing Film Company. The film pioneered the martial arts film genre, and was the first kung fu action film ever created. The film is based on the popular Chinese novel "The Romance of the Red Lotus Temple," which is set in the Qing Dynasty and tells the story of a group of martial artists who band together to defend their temple from raiders. The film is notable for its action sequences and fight scenes, which were groundbreaking for the time and helped establish the martial arts film genre. 

Asian films are known to have a more minimalist approach to film based on their culture. Some martial arts films have only a minimal plot and amount of character development and focus almost exclusively on the action, while others have more creative and complex plots and characters along with action scenes. Films of the latter type are generally considered to be artistically superior films, but many films of the former type are commercially successful and well received by fans of the genre. One of the earliest Hollywood movies to employ the use of martial arts was the 1955 film Bad Day at Black Rock, though the scenes of Spencer Tracy performed barely any realistic fight sequences, but composed mostly of soft knifehand strikes.

Martial arts films contain many characters who are martial artists and these roles are often played by actors who are real martial artists. If not, actors frequently train in preparation for their roles or the action director may rely more on stylized action or film making tricks like camera angles, editing, doubles, undercranking, wire work and computer-generated imagery. Trampolines and springboards used to be used to increase the height of jumps. The minimalist style employs smaller sets and little space for improvised but explosive fight scenes, as seen by Jackie Chan's films. These techniques are sometimes used by real martial artists as well, depending on the style of action in the film.

During the 1970s and 1980s, the most visible presence of martial arts films was the hundreds of English-dubbed kung fu and ninja films produced by the Shaw Brothers, Godfrey Ho and other Hong Kong producers. These films were widely  broadcast on North American television on weekend timeslots that were often colloquially known as Kung Fu Theater, Black Belt Theater or variations thereof. Inclusive in this list of films are commercial classics like The Big Boss, Drunken Master and One Armed Boxer.

Martial arts films have been produced all over the world, but the genre has been dominated by Hong Kong action cinema, peaking from 1971 with the rise of Bruce Lee until the mid-1990s with a general decline in the industry, till it was revived close to the 2000s.
Other notable figures in the genre include Jackie Chan, Jet Li, Sammo Hung, Yuen Biao and Donnie Yen.

Sonny Chiba, Etsuko Shihomi, and Hiroyuki Sanada starred in numerous karate and jidaigeki films from Japan during the 1970s and early 1980s. Hollywood has also participated in the genre with actors such as Chuck Norris, Sho Kosugi, Jean-Claude Van Damme, Steven Seagal, Brandon Lee (son of Bruce Lee), Wesley Snipes, Gary Daniels, Mark Dacascos and Jason Statham. In the 2000s, Thailand's film industry became an international force in the genre with the films of Tony Jaa and the cinema of Vietnam followed suit with The Rebel and Clash.  In more recent years, the Indonesian film industry has offered Merantau (2009) and The Raid: Redemption (2011).

Women have also played key roles in the genre, including such actresses as Michelle Yeoh, Angela Mao and Cynthia Rothrock.  In addition, western animation has ventured into the genre with the most successful effort being the internationally hailed DreamWorks Animation film franchise, Kung Fu Panda, starring Jack Black and Angelina Jolie.

The Matrix is considered revolutionary in American cinema for raising the standard of fight scenes in western cinema.

Subgenres
In the Chinese-speaking world, martial arts films are commonly divided into two subcategories: the wuxia period films (武俠片), and the more modern kung fu films (功夫片, best epitomized in the films of Bruce Lee).
Also Chanbara Samurai sword fighting films many set in Feudal Japan.

Kung fu films are a significant movie genre in themselves. Like westerns for Americans, they have become an identity of Chinese cinema. As the most prestigious movie type in Chinese film history, kung fu movies were among the first Chinese films produced and the wuxia period films (武俠片) are the original form of Chinese kung fu films. The wuxia period films came into vogue due to the thousands of years popularity of wuxia novels (武俠小說). For example, the wuxia novels of Jin Yong and Gu Long directly led to the prevalence of wuxia period films. Outside of the Chinese speaking world the most famous wuxia film made was the Ang Lee film Crouching Tiger, Hidden Dragon, which was based on the Wang Dulu series of wuxia novels: it earned four Academy Awards, including one for Best Foreign Film.

Martial arts westerns are usually American films inexpensively filmed in Southwestern United States locations, transposing martial arts themes into an "old west" setting; e.g., Red Sun with Charles Bronson and Toshiro Mifune.

See also
 List of martial arts films
 List of mixed martial arts films
 Combat in film
 Orange Sky Golden Harvest
 Samurai cinema
 Wuxia

References

External links
 Martial Arts subgenre at Rotten Tomatoes
 martial arts at IMDb
The 20 Greatest Fights Scenes Ever at Rotten Tomatoes
 The 50 Greatest Fight Scenes of Film at Progressiveboink.com
 The Five Best Fight Scenes Ever Filmed  at Esquire.com

 
Exploitation films
Film genres
Theatrical combat